Tibberton is located  from Gloucester and 5 miles from Newent. The current population of Tibberton is approximately 650, reducing to 565 at the 2011 census. The local primary school is Tibberton Community Primary School with roughly 95 pupils and is currently rated "good" by Ofsted, as of September 2012.

Governance
An electoral ward in the same name exists. This ward starts on the outskirts of Gloucester and stretches to Newent. The total population of the ward at the 2011 census was 1,664.

References

Villages in Gloucestershire
Forest of Dean